Abdul Razak Alhassan (born August 11, 1985) is a Ghanaian mixed martial artist who competes in the welterweight division of the UFC. A professional since 2013, he formerly fought in Bellator and Legacy Fighting Championship.

Mixed martial arts career

Early career
After training and competing in judo for 22 years and earning his black belt, Alhassan transitioned to mixed martial arts. He made his professional debut in 2013, winning via TKO in just 25 seconds. Alhassan then compiled an overall record of 6–0 before being signed by the UFC.

Ultimate Fighting Championship
Alhassan made his promotional debut at UFC Fight Night: Mousasi vs. Hall 2 against Charlie Ward on November 19, 2016. He won via knockout 53 seconds into the first round and was awarded a Performance of the Night bonus.

Alhassan then lost a split decision to Omari Akhmedov at UFC Fight Night: Gustafsson vs. Teixeira on May 28, 2017.

Alhassan faced Sabah Homasi on December 2, 2017, at UFC 218, winning by TKO in the first round; some felt referee Herb Dean had stopped the fight prematurely.

Due to the controversial stoppage in the first fight, a rematch with Homasi was held on January 20, 2018, at UFC 220. Alhassan indisputably knocked him out in the first round. The win earned him the Performance of the Night bonus

Alhassan was expected to face Muslim Salikhov on April 14, 2018, at UFC on Fox 29. He was replaced by Ricky Rainey due to injury.

Alhassan knocked out Niko Price in 43 seconds on September 8, 2018, at UFC 228.

Alhassan faced Mounir Lazzez on July 16, 2020, at UFC on ESPN: Kattar vs. Ige. At the weigh-ins, Alhassan weighed in at 174 pounds, 3 pounds over the welterweight non-title fight limit. He was fined 20% of his purse which went to his opponent Lazzez and the bout proceeded at a catchweight. He lost the fight via unanimous decision. This fight was named Fight of the Night bonus; however, Alhassan was disqualified for bonus due to missing weight, as a result a third Performance of the Night bonus was awarded and Lazzez took home an extra $50,000 from the fight.

Alhassan faced Khaos Williams on November 14, 2020, at UFC Fight Night: Felder vs. dos Anjos. At the weigh-ins, Alhassan weighed in at 172.5 pounds, one and a half pounds over the welterweight non-title fight limit. The bout proceeded at a catchweight and Alhassan was fined 20 percent of his purse, which went to his opponent Williams. He was defeated via first-round knockout.

Alhassan faced Jacob Malkoun in a return to middleweight on April 17, 2021, at UFC on ESPN 22. He lost the fight via unanimous decision.

Alhassan was scheduled to face Antônio Braga Neto on August 21, 2021, at UFC on ESPN 29. However, Neto was pulled from the event for undisclosed reasons and Alhassan was scheduled to face Alessio Di Chirico instead. Alhassan won the fight via knockout seventeen seconds into round one. This win earned him the Performance of the Night award.

Alhassan was scheduled to face Joaquin Buckley on January 15, 2021, at UFC on ESPN 32.  However, the pairing was cancelled after Alhassan withdrew for undisclosed reasons  and the pair was rescheduled to UFC Fight Night 201. Alhassan lost the fight via split decision.

Alhassan was scheduled to face Jamie Pickett on July 9, 2022, at UFC on ESPN 39. However, Alhassan pulled out of the bout and was replaced by Denis Tiuliulin.

Alhassan faced Claudio Ribeiro on January 14, 2023, UFC Fight Night 217. He won the fight via knockout in the second round.

Alhassan is scheduled to face Brunno Ferreira on May 20, 2023, at UFC Fight Night 225.

Personal life 
Alhassan and his wife have a son and a daughter.

Rape indictments and acquittal
Alhassan was indicted on September 24, 2018, in Tarrant County, Texas, on charges related to the alleged rapes of two women in one night in March 2018. He pleaded not guilty. The trial began on March 5, 2020. Alhassan's attorney argued that the two women consented to having  sex with Alhassan, and that the allegations of sexual assault were fabricated. After deliberation, the jury found Alhassan not guilty on sexual assault charges.

Championships and awards
 Ultimate Fighting Championship
 Performance of the night (Three times)

Mixed martial arts record

|-
|Win
|align=center|12–5
|Claudio Ribeiro
|KO (punches)
|UFC Fight Night: Strickland vs. Imavov
|
|align=center|2
|align=center|0:28
|Las Vegas, Nevada, United States
|
|-
|Loss
|align=center|11–5
|Joaquin Buckley
|Decision (split)
|UFC Fight Night: Walker vs. Hill
|
|align=center|3
|align=center|5:00
|Las Vegas, Nevada, United States
|
|-
|Win
|align=center|11–4
|Alessio Di Chirico
|KO (head kick)
|UFC on ESPN: Barboza vs. Chikadze
|
|align=center|1
|align=center|0:17
|Las Vegas, Nevada, United States
|
|-
|Loss
|align=center|10–4
|Jacob Malkoun
|Decision (unanimous)
|UFC on ESPN: Whittaker vs. Gastelum
|
|align=center|3
|align=center|5:00
|Las Vegas, Nevada, United States
|
|-
|Loss
|align=center|10–3
|Khaos Williams
|KO (punch)
|UFC Fight Night: Felder vs. dos Anjos
|
|align=center|1
|align=center|0:30
|Las Vegas, Nevada, United States
|
|-
|Loss
|align=center|10–2
|Mounir Lazzez
|Decision (unanimous)
|UFC on ESPN: Kattar vs. Ige 
|
|align=center|3
|align=center|5:00
|Abu Dhabi, United Arab Emirates
|
|-
|Win
|align=center|10–1
|Niko Price
|KO (punch)
|UFC 228 
|
|align=center|1
|align=center|0:43
|Dallas, Texas, United States
|
|-
|Win
|align=center|9–1
|Sabah Homasi
|KO (punch)
|UFC 220 
|
|align=center|1
|align=center|3:47
|Boston, Massachusetts, United States
|
|-
|Win
|align=center|8–1
|Sabah Homasi
|TKO (punches)
|UFC 218 
|
|align=center|1
|align=center|4:21
|Detroit, Michigan, United States
|
|-
|Loss
|align=center|7–1
|Omari Akhmedov
|Decision (split)
|UFC Fight Night: Gustafsson vs. Teixeira
|
|align=center|3
|align=center|5:00
|Stockholm, Sweden
|
|-
|Win
|align=center|7–0
|Charlie Ward
|KO (punch)
|UFC Fight Night: Mousasi vs. Hall 2
|
|align=center|1
|align=center|0:53
|Belfast, Northern Ireland
|
|-
|Win
|align=center|6–0
|Jos Eichelberger
|TKO (punches)
|Legacy FC 61
|
|align=center|1
|align=center|0:57
|Dallas, Texas, United States
|
|-
|Win
|align=center|5–0
|Ken Jackson
|TKO (punches)
|Rage in the Cage 47: Night of Champions
|
|align=center|1
|align=center|0:40
|Shawnee, Oklahoma, United States
|
|-
|Win
|align=center|4–0
|Bryce Shepard-Mejia
|KO (punch)
|Bellator 143
|
|align=center|1
|align=center|1:26
|Hidalgo, Texas, United States
|
|-
|Win
|align=center|3–0
|Matt McKeon
|TKO (punches)
|Rocks Xtreme MMA 12
|
|align=center|1
|align=center|0:47
|Harker Heights, Texas, United States
|
|-
|Win
|align=center|2–0
|Matt Jones
|TKO (punches)
|Bellator 111
|
|align=center|1
|align=center|1:23
|Thackerville, Oklahoma, United States
|
|-
|Win
|align=center|1–0
|Kolby Adams
|TKO (punches)
|Xtreme Knockout 20
|
|align=center|1
|align=center|0:25
|Arlington, Texas, United States
|

References

External links
 
 

1985 births
Welterweight mixed martial artists
Living people
Ghanaian male mixed martial artists
Ghanaian Muay Thai practitioners
Ghanaian male judoka
American male mixed martial artists
American Muay Thai practitioners
American male judoka
Middleweight mixed martial artists
Mixed martial artists utilizing Muay Thai
Mixed martial artists utilizing judo
Ghanaian emigrants to the United States
Sportspeople from Accra
Ultimate Fighting Championship male fighters